Guy Genet (born 14 August 1955) is a French former professional footballer who played as a defender. As of 2021, he works as a sports coordinator and kit man for Lyon; he started working in these roles in 1996.

Personal life 
Guy's son Alexis is also a former footballer.

References 

1955 births
Living people
Footballers from Lyon
French footballers
Association football defenders
Olympique Lyonnais players
INF Vichy players
Nîmes Olympique players
Olympique Alès players
FC Villefranche Beaujolais players
Ligue 1 players
Ligue 2 players
French Division 3 (1971–1993) players
French football managers
Olympique Lyonnais non-playing staff